Trujillina is a genus of Caribbean wandering spiders first described by E. B. Bryant in 1948.  it contains only three species on Hispaniola and in Puerto Rico: T. hursti, T. isolata, and T. spinipes.

References

Araneomorphae genera
Ctenidae
Spiders of the Caribbean